Pleasant Valley High School (often simply known as Pleasant Valley) is a public co-educational and comprehensive high school located in Chico, California teaching ninth grade through twelfth grade. It is part of the Chico Unified School District, which serves around 14,358 students.

Academics

Advanced Placement 
Pleasant Valley High School's available AP classes are AP English Language and Composition, AP English Literature and Composition, AP Seminar, AP World History, AP US History, AP Government, AP Macroeconomics, AP Psychology, AP Chemistry, AP Biology, AP Environmental Science, AP Calculus, AP Statistics, AP Spanish, online AP French, AP 2-D Art and Design, and AP Drawing. Pleasant Valley offers the AP Capstone program and its respective diplomas and academic certificates.

International Baccalaureate Programme 
Pleasant Valley used to offer the IB Diploma Programme; it provided the IB exams for English, Chemistry, Biology, History, French, Spanish, Japanese, Mathematics, and Theater Arts.

Notable alumni 
 Aaron Rodgers National Football League player and venture capitalist, 2002 graduate
 Brian Cage All Elite Wrestling professional wrestler, 2002 graduate
 Brian Jones Arena Football League player, 2019 graduate
 Geoff Swaim National Football League player, 2011 graduate
 Evan MacLane Major League Baseball player, 2001 graduate
 Jordan Rodgers American sports commentator and former National Football League player and The Bachelorette contestant, 2007 graduate
 Luke Barker Major League Baseball pitcher for the Milwaukee Brewers, 2010 graduate
 Pat Clements Major League Baseball player, 1980 graduate

References

External links 
 Pleasant Valley High School official website
 California Department of Education Dataquest report on Pleasant Valley High

1964 establishments in California
Buildings and structures in Chico, California
Educational institutions established in 1964
Education in Chico, California
High schools in Butte County, California
International Baccalaureate schools in California
Public high schools in California